AK Racing was a championship-winning NASCAR Winston Cup Series team. It was originally owned by Bill Terry before he sold it to rookie driver Alan Kulwicki, who controlled and raced for the team until his death in 1993. Kulwicki won five races as an owner-driver. Until Tony Stewart won the championship in 2011, he was the last owner-driver to win a Cup Series championship, which he won in 1992.

History

Bill Terry era
The team debuted at the 1982 Cracker Barrel Country Store 420 at Nashville Speedway USA with Bob Jarvis driving it as the No. 32 Clinomint Buick, finishing 28th out of 30 cars. Two races later, the No. 32 ran again at the World 600, with Bosco Lowe qualifying 40th and finishing 16th. Lowe drove the car in the Daytona 500 the following season, finishing 39th after a crash. Tommy Ellis drove their next race, bringing the Big Daddy's Buick to a 15th-place finish at Charlotte. Butch Lindley drove the final race of the 1983 season for the team at Martinsville Speedway, finishing 25th after suffering rear end problems.

Alan Kulwicki era
The team was inactive until 1986, when it fielded a full-time car driven by rookie Alan Kulwicki. The car was now the No. 35 Quincy's Steak House Ford. After 14 starts, Terry sold the team to Kulwicki. After winning Rookie of the Year honors, Kulwicki changed the number of the car to No. 7 and got sponsorship from Zerex. Kulwicki won three pole positions and finished 15th in points. In 1988, Kulwicki won his first career race at Phoenix International Raceway. In celebration, he drove the now-famous Polish Victory Lap. He won once more in 1990, but lost his Zerex sponsorship. After beginning 1991 with no sponsor, he got a one-race deal with Hooters after their regular driver, Mark Stahl, failed to qualify. Hooters then signed up to sponsor the No. 7 full-time and Kulwicki won three races over the next two seasons. The peak of the team's success was 1992, when Kulwicki became the first owner-driver since Richard Petty did so in 1979 to win a Winston Cup championship. Entering the Hooters 500 (coincidentally, Petty's final race) as one of six drivers with a chance, Kulwicki finished second behind race winner Bill Elliott and led the most laps, enabling him to win the Cup by 10 points over Elliott. The car that won the championship carried the "Underbird" branding, which Kulwicki was able to do after obtaining permission from Ford to do so.

Kulwicki died in a plane crash five races into the 1993 season while flying back from a sponsor event. Under his ownership, the team won five races and recorded 75 top ten finishes with the last victory coming at Pocono Raceway the year before.

After Kulwicki's death
The team ran under the financial guidance of SABCO Motorsports and Felix Sabates, but under Kulwicki's name, with Jimmy Hensley and Tommy Kendall driving until midway through 1993, when Bud Moore Engineering driver Geoff Bodine purchased the team's assets and ran it as Geoff Bodine Racing. In 1999, Bodine sold his portion of the team to Jim Mattei and John Porter and moved to drive for owner Joe Bessey, and the team began running Chevrolets. The next year the renamed Mattei Motorsports was bought midseason by Jim Smith, owner of Ultra Motorsports, and brought the No. 7 car into that team's fold. The last member of AK Racing who was still with the No. 7 team, Rich Wolski, was released in July 2000. Smith continued to run the team until 2004, during which time the team switched back to Ford and later fielded Dodges as part of a short-lived alliance with Ray Evernham's team. In 2005, Ultra's Cup Series assets were sold to driver Robby Gordon, who renamed the team Robby Gordon Motorsports and kept Smith as a part owner. Gordon continued to run the team until 2012, when he ran only a partial season and then shut down due to lack of sponsorship and funding. Smith left the team following the 2006 season after he shut down Ultra Motorsports. In 2013 driver / crew chief / owner Tommy Baldwin Jr. started a second team with the 7 number to run with Dave Blaney. Michael Annett, Alex Bowman, and Regan Smith drove the 7 in respective years after until the team became part time in 2017.

References

External links
 
 

1982 establishments in North Carolina
1993 disestablishments in North Carolina
American auto racing teams
Defunct NASCAR teams